Lauren Brennan (born 1 January 1995) is a Northern Irish footballer who plays as a forward and has appeared for the Northern Ireland women's national team.

Career
In February 2020 Brennan was signed by Forfar Farmington. She had been playing for Sion Swifts, having spent two years in Iceland with Grindavik. A subsequent spell in Australia was curtailed by an anterior cruciate ligament injury.

Brennan has been capped for the Northern Ireland national team, appearing for the team during the 2019 FIFA Women's World Cup qualifying cycle.

References

External links
 
 
 
 

1995 births
Living people
Women's association footballers from Northern Ireland
Northern Ireland women's international footballers
Women's association football forwards
Expatriate sportspeople from Northern Ireland in Iceland
Expatriate women's footballers in Iceland
Women's Premiership (Northern Ireland) players
Sion Swifts Ladies F.C. players
Forfar Farmington F.C. players
Scottish Women's Premier League players